Sérgio Fontes Silva (born 20 November 1992) known as Sérgio Ministro,  is a Portuguese professional footballer who plays for Mafra as a midfielder.

Football career
On 21 July 2018, Ministro made his professional debut with Mafra in a 2018–19 Taça da Liga match against Sporting Covilhã.

References

External links

1992 births
Living people
Portuguese footballers
Association football midfielders
Segunda Divisão players
S.C. Espinho players
C.D. Mafra players